The Mancos Shale or Mancos Group is a Late Cretaceous (Upper Cretaceous) geologic formation of the Western United States.

The Mancos Shale was first described by Cross and Purington in 1899 and was named for exposures near the town of Mancos, Colorado.

Geology
The unit is dominated by mudrock that accumulated in offshore and marine environments of the Cretaceous North American Inland Sea.  The Mancos was deposited during the Cenomanian (locally Albian) through Campanian ages, approximately from 95 million years ago (Ma) to 80 Ma.

Stratigraphically the Mancos Shale fills the interval between the Dakota and the Mesaverde Group.

The lower marine Mancos Shale conformably intertongues with terrestrial sandstones and mudstones of the Dakota and in its upper part grades into and intertongues with the Mesaverde Group. The shale tongues typically have sharp basal contacts and gradational upper contacts. Whereas in the plains east of the Rocky Mountains certain mappable marine shales are identified as formations (e.g., Skull Creek, Graneros), correlated deposits within the distribution of the Mancos are named as tongues of the greater Mancos Formation.

Thus, the classification broadly corresponds with the Colorado Group classification of the Great Plains region. As such, various units of the Colorado Group are recognized within the Mancos in those areas where their distinct facies can be recognized.

Occurrences
The Mancos occurs in the Basin and Range Province, the Colorado Plateau Province, and the San Juan Mountains Province.

Structural basins
The Mancos is a diverse unit, with dozens of named subunits in different structural basins that often intertongue with other formations. The subunits and intertonguing formations (in italics) in each basin, in stratigraphic order, are:

History of investigation
The Mancos Shale was first named by Charles Whitman Cross and C.W. Purington in 1899, for outcrops near the town of Mancos, Colorado and along the Mancos River nearby. The two geologists also traced the unit into the Telluride, Colorado area. W.T. Lee had traced the unit north into the Grand Mesa area, defining it as all marine shale between the Dakota and the Mesaverde. It was subsequently traced into Utah and New Mexico.

During their work in New Mexico in 1924, J.B. Reeside, Jr., and F.H. Knowlton found that the Mancos Shale could be divided into biostratigraphic corresponding closely to formations of the Colorado Group further east. By 1944, Rankin had concluded that most of the formations of the Colorado Group could be identified as lithostratigraphic members of the Mancos Shale as well. The unit was raised to group rank by C.E. Jamison in 1911, and is sometimes given group rank in New Mexico and Utah as well.

See also

 List of fossiliferous stratigraphic units in Arizona
 List of fossiliferous stratigraphic units in Colorado
 List of fossiliferous stratigraphic units in New Mexico
 List of fossiliferous stratigraphic units in Utah
 List of fossiliferous stratigraphic units in Wyoming

References

Shale formations of the United States
Upper Cretaceous Series of North America
Cretaceous United States
Campanian Stage
Cenomanian Stage
Coniacian Stage
Santonian Stage
Turonian Stage
Cretaceous Arizona
Cretaceous Colorado
Cretaceous formations of New Mexico
Cretaceous geology of Texas
Cretaceous geology of Utah
Cretaceous geology of Wyoming
Geology of the Rocky Mountains